José Javier de Baquíjano y Carrillo de Córdoba, III Count of Vistaflorida (March 12, 1751, Lima, Peru—January 24, 1817, Seville, Spain) was a Spanish/Peruvian economist and jurist, writer and politician, and one of the first great intellectuals of the Viceroyalty of Peru.

He was the second son of Juan Bautista de Baquíjano y Urigoen, I Count of Vistaflorida, and María Ignacia Carrillo de Córdova y Garcés de Mansilla.

Baquíjano inherited the Vistaflorida title from his older brother in 1809, becoming 3rd Count of Vistaflorida. 

Baquíjano earned a doctorate in law from the University of San Marcos in Lima. In 1773-76 he traveled to Spain, where he met Pablo de Olavide and Gaspar Melchor de Jovellanos. Upon his return to Peru, he took on the task of protector of the Indigenous, and became a professor of law.

El elogio a Jáuregui
He was celebrated for his speech welcoming the new viceroy Agustín de Jáuregui to Lima in 1780. This was published in 1781 as El elogio a Jáuregui, and was mixed with strong criticism of the viceregal government. His veiled attack on the economic and Indigenous policy of Visitador (Royal Inspector) José Antonio de Áreche was unprecedented. He quoted Montesquieu, Raynal, Machiavelli y Las Casas in defense of his positions. Áreche called his doctrines "execrable". The Argentine Balthasar Maciel attempted a rebuttal of the speech.

Economic thought
Baquíjano was a mercantilist economic thinker, although he was also influenced by the English economist Josiah Child, a qualified exponent of free trade. Baquíjano believed that free trade and the separation of the Viceroyalty of Río de la Plata were the causes of the economic crisis in Peru at the end of the eighteenth century. He supported the position that the Peruvian economy depended on the export of precious metals.

Academic and literary work
He led a reformist group at the University, arguing for the replacement of Scholasticism with the thought of men such as Descartes, Newton and Juan Heinecio. This group also supported the Encyclopedists and freedom of the press. In 1783 Baquíjano lost an election for rector. Thus he was not able to put his reforms into effect in the University, but he did so in the Colegio de San Carlos. He became vice-rector of San Marcos in 1791.

From 1791 to 1795 he was editor of the Mercurio Peruano, which rejected the radicalism of the French Revolution. In the Mercurio, Baquíjano published histories of the Audiencia of Lima, of the University, and of the mines in Potosí, as well as a dissertation on the economy of Peru. In 1793 he became president of the Sociedad Académica de Amantes del País (Academic Society of Lovers of the Country).

Politics
He returned to Spain for some years around this time. In Cádiz he became friends with Bernardo O'Higgins. He was the mentor of a Criollo political movement seeking autonomy for the colony and equality between Criollos and Peninsulares.

Back in Lima, he became oidor (judge) of the Audiencia in 1807. Also that year he became third count of Vistaflorida. In 1814 he was in Madrid, and that year he became a magistrate of the Council of the Indies. Later he became an honorary council member.

He criticized the Spanish policy against the insurgents in Peru, calling it foolish and arguing for an end of hostilities. Yet he was a loyalist in his way, not a separatist. He argued for judicial, ecclesiastical and economic autonomy, but under the Crown of Spain. Still, his strong criticism of the viceregal system and his support of liberal principles lent support to the independence movement. For that reason, he is recognized as a precursor of Peruvian independence.

References
  Riva Agüero, J. de la, "José Baquíjano y Carrillo", in Historia del Perú, vol. II, 3rd ed., Lima, 1953.
  Maticorena Estrada, M., Nuevas noticias y documentos de D. José Baquíjano y Carrillo, Lima, 1960.
  Deustua, C., José Baquíjano, Lima, 1964.

External links
  Gran Enciclopedia Rialp
  Encarta (Archived 2009-10-31)

1751 births
1817 deaths
History of Peru
Peruvian people of Spanish descent
Spanish economists
Spanish male writers
Spanish politicians
Counts of Spain